A by-election was held in the Dáil Éireann Meath constituency in Ireland on Friday, 11 March 2005. It followed the resignation of Fine Gael Teachta Dála (TD) John Bruton on 31 October 2004 to take up his new position as European Union Ambassador to the United States.

Tommy Reilly, the original Fianna Fáil candidate, was forced to stand down due to some land rezoning issues.  

On 15 February 2005 the campaign began in earnest when it was announced that polling would take place on 11 March. Seven candidates contested the vacant seat, with victory going to the Fine Gael candidate, Shane McEntee.  

On the same day, a by-election took place in Kildare North, both were the final occasions which the Progressive Democrats contested by-elections.

Result

See also
List of Dáil by-elections
Dáil constituencies

References

2005 Meath by-election
2005 in Irish politics
29th Dáil
By-elections in the Republic of Ireland
Elections in County Meath
March 2005 events in Europe